The following highways are numbered 172:

Canada
  New Brunswick Route 172
  Prince Edward Island Route 172
  Quebec Route 172

Ireland
 R172 road

Japan
 Japan National Route 172

United States
 Interstate 172 (former)
 Interstate 172
 Alabama State Route 172
 Arizona State Route 172 (former)
 California State Route 172
 Colorado State Highway 172
 Connecticut Route 172
 Georgia State Route 172
 Illinois Route 172
 Kentucky Route 172
 Louisiana Highway 172
 Maine State Route 172
 Maryland Route 172
 M-172 (Michigan highway) (former)
 Minnesota State Highway 172
 Mississippi Highway 172
 Missouri Route 172
 Nevada State Route 172
 New Jersey Route 172
 New Mexico State Road 172
 New York State Route 172
 North Carolina Highway 172
 Ohio State Route 172
 Pennsylvania Route 172 (former)
 South Carolina Highway 172
 Tennessee State Route 172
 Texas State Highway 172
 Texas State Highway Loop 172
 Texas State Highway Spur 172
 Farm to Market Road 172 (Texas)
 Utah State Route 172
 Virginia State Route 172
 Washington State Route 172
 Wisconsin Highway 172
 Wyoming Highway 172
Territories:
 Puerto Rico Highway 172